Several islands are present in Maui County, Hawaii. Lists of sites listed on the National Register of Historic Places on each individual island can be found at
National Register of Historic Places listings in Hawaii#Molokai
National Register of Historic Places listings in Hawaii#Lanai
National Register of Historic Places listings in Hawaii#Kahoolawe
National Register of Historic Places listings in Hawaii#Maui